Looking for Richard is a 1996 American documentary film directed by Al Pacino, in his directorial debut. It is a hybrid film, including both a filmed performance of selected scenes of William Shakespeare's Richard III and a documentary element which explores a broader examination of Shakespeare's continuing role and relevance in popular culture. The film was featured at the Sundance Film Festival in January 1996 and it was screened in the Un Certain Regard section at the 1996 Cannes Film Festival. Al Pacino won the Directors Guild of America Award for Outstanding Directing – Documentaries.

Description
Pacino plays both himself and the title character, Richard III.  The film guides the audience through the play's plot and historical background.  Pacino and several fellow actors, including Penelope Allen and Harris Yulin, act out scenes from the play.

In addition, the actors comment on their roles.  Pacino also features other actors famous for performing Shakespeare, such as Vanessa Redgrave, Kenneth Branagh, John Gielgud, Derek Jacobi, James Earl Jones, and Kevin Kline. Pacino includes interviews with Shakespeare scholars such as Barbara Everett, as well as ordinary people on the street.

Cast
 Al Pacino as Richard III
 Penelope Allen as Queen Elizabeth
 Harris Yulin as King Edward
 Kevin Spacey as Buckingham
 Winona Ryder as Lady Anne
 Kevin Conway as Lord Hastings
 Julie Moret as Mistress Shore
 Estelle Parsons as Queen Margaret
 Alec Baldwin as Clarence
 Aidan Quinn as Richmond

Reception
The film received positive reviews from critics.

References

External links

 Magazine Americana, December 2001 web article, "Looking Through Richard: Al Pacino and his Call to Shakespeare".

1996 films
1996 documentary films
American documentary films
Fox Searchlight Pictures films
Documentary films about writers
Documentary films about actors
Documentary films about theatre
Films based on Richard III (play)
Films directed by Al Pacino
1996 directorial debut films
Films scored by Howard Shore
1990s English-language films
1990s American films